Benign neonatal hemangiomatosis is a rare skin condition that presents in infancy with multiple benign tumors called infantile hemangiomas, but without hemangiomas in other organs.

See also 
 Infantile hemangioma
 Diffuse neonatal hemangiomatosis
 List of cutaneous conditions

References 

Cutaneous congenital anomalies